Throndhjems Stiftstidende was a newspaper published in Norway between 1836 and 1854. It reported mostly on foreign affairs.

References

1836 establishments in Norway
1854 disestablishments
Defunct newspapers published in Norway